This is a list of the bird species recorded in Southern Africa. Southern Africa is defined as Africa south of a line between the Kunene and Zambezi rivers, encompassing Namibia, Botswana, Zimbabwe, mainland South Africa, Lesotho, Eswatini and southern and central Mozambique, as well as oceanic waters within  of the coast, covering approximately 3.5 million square kilometres.

Traditional boundaries

In Layard's 1867 treatise on the regional avifauna, he arbitrarily defined "South Africa" as the region south of 28° South. Sharpe's 1884 revision of Layard's work extended the boundary to the Cuanza and Zambezi rivers, believing that the latter is a natural avifaunal limit. Stark and Sclater, possibly influenced by national boundaries determined at the Berlin Conference, substituted the Cuanza with the Kunene River for the first of their volumes, which appeared in 1900. The latter definition became entrenched with many ornithological publications following suit.

Regional habitats

Southern Africa consists of eight major habitats: the Karoo, moist savannah, arid savannah, the Namib Desert, lowland forest, fynbos, grassland and montane forest.

Taxonomy

This list's taxonomic treatment (designation and sequence of orders, families and species) and nomenclature (common and scientific names) follow the conventions of Austin Roberts' Birds of Southern Africa 7th edition. The family accounts of the respective headers, and the species counts per family, reflect this taxonomy. Introduced, accidental, and extirpated species are included in the total species counts for Southern Africa.

The following tags have been used to highlight several categories, but not all species fall into one of these categories. Those that do not are commonly occurring native species.

Accidental: - a species that rarely or accidentally occurs in the Southern Africa
Endemic: - a species endemic to Southern Africa
Extirpated:  - a species that no longer occurs in Southern Africa though populations exist elsewhere
Introduced: - a species introduced to Southern Africa as a direct or indirect consequence of human actions
Data deficient: - a species with uncertain status due to lack of research or available information

Penguins
Order: SphenisciformesFamily: Spheniscidae

The number of penguin species is a matter of debate. Depending on the authority, biodiversity varies between 17 and 20 living species. Four species occur in Southern Africa, though only one is resident or a breeder.

 African penguin, Spheniscus demersus
 King penguin, Aptenodytes patagonicus - accidental
 Macaroni penguin, Eudyptes chrysolophus - accidental
 Rockhopper penguin,  Eudyptes chrysocome - accidental

Grebes
Order: PodicipediformesFamily: Podicipedidae

Grebes are small to medium-large freshwater diving birds. They have lobed toes and are excellent swimmers and divers. However, they have their feet placed far back on the body, making them quite ungainly on land. There are 20 species worldwide and three species occur in Southern Africa.

 Little grebe, Tachybaptus ruficollis
 Great crested grebe, Podiceps cristatus
 Black-necked grebe, Podiceps nigricollis

Albatrosses
Order: ProcellariiformesFamily: Diomedeidae

The albatrosses comprise between 13 and 24 species (the number of species is still a matter of some debate, 21 being the most commonly accepted number) in 4 genera. The four genera are the great albatrosses (Diomedea), the mollymawks (Thalassarche), the North Pacific albatrosses (Phoebastria), and the sooty albatrosses or sooties (Phoebetria). Of the four genera, the North Pacific albatrosses are considered a sister taxon to the great albatrosses, while the sooty albatrosses are considered closer to the mollymawks.

 Tristan albatross, Diomedea dabbenena
 Wandering albatross, Diomedea exulans
 Southern royal albatross, Diomedea epomophora
 Northern royal albatross, Diomedea sanfordi
 Shy albatross, Thalassarche cauta
 Black-browed albatross, Thalassarche melanophris
 Atlantic yellow-nosed albatross, Thalassarche chlororhynchos
 Grey-headed albatross, Thalassarche chrysostoma
 Salvin's albatross, Thalassarche salvini
 Chatham albatross, Thalassarche eremita
 Buller's albatross, Thalassarche bulleri - accidental
 Indian yellow-nosed albatross, Thalassarche carteri
 Light-mantled albatross, Phoebetria palpebrata - accidental
 Sooty albatross, Phoebetria fusca - accidental
 Laysan albatross, Phoebastria immutabilis - accidental

Shearwaters and petrels
Order: ProcellariiformesFamily: Procellariidae

The Procellariids are the main group of medium-sized "true petrels", characterised by united nostrils with medium septum and a long outer functional primary.

 Southern giant petrel, Macronectes giganteus
 Northern giant petrel, Macronectes halli
 Southern fulmar, Fulmarus glacialoides
 Antarctic petrel, Thalassoica antarctica - accidental
 Pintado petrel, Daption capense
 Great-winged petrel, Pterodroma macroptera
 White-headed petrel, Pterodroma lessonii
 Atlantic petrel, Pterodroma incerta - accidental
 Barau's petrel, Pterodroma baraui - accidental
 Soft-plumaged petrel, Pterodroma mollis
 Kerguelen petrel, Lugensa brevirostris
 Blue petrel, Halobaena caerulea
 Broad-billed prion, Pachyptila vittata
 Salvin's prion, Pachyptila salvini
 Antarctic prion, Pachyptila desolata
 Fulmar prion, Pachyptila crassirostris
 Slender-billed prion, Pachyptila belcheri - accidental
 Fairy prion, Pachyptila turtur
 Bulwer's petrel, Bulweria bulwerii - accidental
 Jouanin's petrel, Bulweria fallax
 White-chinned petrel, Procellaria aequinoctialis
 Spectacled petrel, Procellaria conspicillata
 Grey petrel, Procellaria cinerea
 Cory's shearwater, Calonectris diomedea
 Streaked shearwater, Calonectris leucomelas - accidental
 Great shearwater, Ardenna gravis
 Flesh-footed shearwater, Ardenna carneipes
 Sooty shearwater, Ardenna griseus
 Wedge-tailed shearwater, Ardenna pacificus
 Manx shearwater, Puffinus puffinus
 Balearic shearwater, Puffinus mauretanicus
 Tropical shearwater, Puffinus bailloni - accidental
 Little shearwater, Puffinus assimilis

Storm petrels
Order: ProcellariiformesFamily: Hydrobatidae

The storm petrel, a relative of the petrel, is the smallest seabird. It feeds on planktonic crustaceans and small fish from the surface, typically while hovering. Its flight is fluttering and sometimes bat-like.

 White-faced storm petrel, Pelagodroma marina - accidental
 Matsudaira's storm petrel, Oceanodroma matsudairae - accidental
 Wilson's storm petrel, Oceanites oceanicus
 Leach's storm petrel, Oceanodroma leucorhoa
 European storm petrel, Hydrobatesn pelagicus
 Black-bellied storm petrel, Fregetta tropica
 White-bellied storm petrel, Fregetta grallaria - accidental
 Grey-backed storm petrel, Garrodia nereis

Diving petrels
Order: ProcellariiformesFamily: Pelecanoididae

 Common diving petrel, Pelecanoides urinatrix

Tropicbirds
Order: PhaethontiformesFamily: Phaethontidae

Tropicbirds are slender white birds of tropical oceans, with exceptionally long central tail feathers. Their long wings have black markings, as does the head.

 Red-tailed tropicbird, Phaethon rubricauda
 Red-billed tropicbird, Phaethon aethereus - accidental
 White-tailed tropicbird, Phaethon lepturus - accidental

Boobies and gannets
Order: SuliformesFamily: Sulidae

The sulids comprise the gannets and boobies with only boobies occurring in Southern Africa. Both groups are medium-large coastal seabirds that plunge-dive for fish.

Genus Sula
 Brown booby, Sula leucogaster
 Red-footed booby, Sula dactylatra

Genus Morus
 Cape gannet, Morus capensis
 Australian gannet, Morus serrator

Cormorants
Order: SuliformesFamily: Phalacrocoracidae

Phalacrocoracidae is a family of medium to large coastal, fish-eating seabirds that includes cormorants and shags. Plumage colouration is varied with the majority having mainly dark plumage, some species being black-and-white and a few being quite colourful.

 White-breasted cormorant, Phalacrocorax lucidus
 Cape cormorant, Phalacrocorax capensis - endemic
 Bank cormorant, Phalacrocorax neglectus
 Reed cormorant, Microcarbo africanus
 Crowned cormorant, Microcarbo coronatus

Darters
Order: SuliformesFamily: Anhingidae

There are four living species, one of which is near-threatened. The darters are often called "snake-birds" because of their long thin neck, which gives a snake-like appearance when they swim with their bodies submerged.

 African darter, Anhinga melanogaster

Frigatebirds
Order: SuliformesFamily: Fregatidae

Frigatebirds are large seabirds usually found over tropical oceans. They are large, black or black-and-white, with long wings and deeply forked tails. The males have coloured inflatable throat pouches. They do not swim or walk and cannot take off from a flat surface. Having the largest wingspan-to-body-weight ratio of any bird, they are essentially aerial, able to stay aloft for more than a week.

 Great frigatebird, Fregata minor
 Lesser frigatebird, Fregata ariel

Pelicans
Order: PelecaniformesFamily: Pelecanidae

Pelicans are very large water birds with a distinctive pouch under their beak. Like other birds in the order Pelecaniformes, they have four webbed toes.

 Eastern white pelican, Pelecanus onocrotalus
 Pink-backed pelican, Pelecanus rufescens

Herons, egrets, and bitterns
Order: PelecaniformesFamily: Ardeidae

The family Ardeidae contains the bitterns, herons and egrets. Herons and egrets are medium to large wading birds with long necks and legs. Bitterns tend to be shorter necked and more secretive. Members of Ardeidae fly with their necks retracted, unlike other long-necked birds such as storks, ibises and spoonbills.

Herons
 Grey heron, Ardea cinerea
 Black-headed heron, Ardea melanocephala
 Goliath heron, Ardea goliath
 Purple heron, Ardea purpurea
 Squacco heron, Ardeola ralloides
 Madagascar heron, Ardeola idae
 Rufous-bellied heron, Ardeola rufiventris
 White-backed night heron, Gorsachius leuconotus
 Black-crowned night heron, Nycticorax nycticorax
 Green-backed heron, Butorides striatus
 Little blue heron, Egretta caerulea - accidental
 Western reef heron, Egretta gularis - accidental

Egrets
 Yellow-billed egret, Egretta intermedia
 Great egret, Ardea alba
 Little egret, Egretta garzetta
 Cattle egret, Bubulcus ibis
 Black egret, Egretta ardesiaca
 Slaty egret, Egretta vinaceigula

Bitterns
 Great bittern, Botaurus stellaris
 Dwarf bittern, Ixobrychus sturmii
 Little bittern, Ixobrychus minutus

Ibises and spoonbills
Order: PelecaniformesFamily: Threskiornithidae

Threskiornithidae is a family of large terrestrial and wading birds that includes the ibises and spoonbills. They have long, broad wings with 11 primary and about 20 secondary feathers. They are strong fliers and, rather surprisingly, given their size and weight, very capable soarers.

 African spoonbill, Platalea alba
 Sacred ibis, Threskiornis aethiopicus
 Hadeda ibis, Bostrychia hagedash
 Glossy ibis, Plegadis falcinellus
 Southern bald ibis, Geronticus calvus - endemic

Hamerkop
Order: PelecaniformesFamily: Scopidae

 Hamerkop, Scopus umbretta

Storks
Order: CiconiiformesFamily: Ciconiidae

Storks have no syrinx and are mute, giving no bird call; bill-clattering is an important mode of communication at the nest. Many species are migratory. Most storks eat frogs, fish, insects, earthworms, and small birds or mammals.

 Black stork, Ciconia nigra
 White stork, Ciconia ciconia
 Abdim's stork, Ciconia abdimii
 Yellow-billed stork, Ciconia ibis
 Marabou stork, Leptoptilos crumeniferus
 Saddle-billed stork, Ephippiorhynchus senegalensis
 Open-billed stork, Anastomus lamelligerus
 Woolly-necked stork, Ciconia episcopus

Flamingoes
Order: PhoenicopteriformesFamily: Phoenicopteridae

Flamingos filter-feed on shellfish and algae. Their oddly shaped beaks are specially adapted to separate mud and silt from the food they consume and, uniquely, are used upside-down.

 Greater flamingo, Phoenicopterus roseus
 Lesser flamingo, Phoenicopterus minor

Ducks, geese and swans
Order: AnseriformesFamily: Anatidae

Anatidae includes the ducks and most duck-like waterfowl, such as geese and swans. These birds are adapted to an aquatic existence, with webbed feet, bills that are flattened to some extent, and oily feathers that readily shed water.

 Mute swan, Cygnus olor - introduced
 Knob-billed duck, Sarkidiornis melanotos
 Egyptian goose, Alopochen aegyptiacus
 South African shelduck, Tadorna cana
 Spur-winged goose, Plectropterus gambensis
 White-faced whistling duck, Dendrocygna viduata
 Fulvous whistling duck, Dendrocygna bicolor
 White-backed duck, Thalassornis leuconotus
 African pygmy goose, Nettapus auritus
 African black duck, Anas sparsa
 Mallard, Anas platyrhynchos - introduced
 Northern shoveler, Anas clypeata - accidental
 Northern pintail, Anas acuta - accidental
 Garganey, Anas querquedula - accidental
 Cape teal, Anas capensis
 Yellow-billed duck, Anas undulata
 Red-billed teal, Anas erythrorhyncha
 Blue-billed teal, Anas hottentota
 Cape shoveler, Anas smithii
 Southern pochard, Netta erythrophthalma
 Maccoa duck, Oxyura maccoa
 Tufted duck, Aythya fuligula - introduced

Osprey
Order: AccipitriformesFamily: Pandionidae

 Osprey, Pandion haliaetus

Hawks to Old World vultures
Order: AccipitriformesFamily: Accipitridae

Accipitridae is a family of birds of prey, which includes hawks, eagles, kites, harriers, snake eagles, goshawks, sparrowhawks, buzzards and old world vultures. These birds have very large powerful hooked beaks for tearing flesh from their prey, strong legs, powerful talons and keen eyesight.

Subfamily: Aegypiinae
 Lappet-faced vulture, Torgos tracheliotus
 White-headed vulture, Triginoceps occipitalis
 Rüppell's vulture, Gyps rueppellii - accidental
 Cape vulture, Gyps coprotheres
 White-backed vulture, Gyps africanus
 Bearded vulture, Gypaetus barbatus
 Palm-nut vulture, Gyphohierax angolensis
 Egyptian vulture, Neophron percnopterus - accidental
 Hooded vulture, Necrosyrtes monachus

Subfamily: Buteoninae
 African fish eagle, Haliaeetus vocifer
 Bateleur, Terathopius ecaudatus
 African hawk-eagle, Aquila spilogaster
 Ayres's hawk-eagle, Aquila ayresii
 Steppe eagle, Aquila nipalensis
 Tawny eagle, Aquila rapax
 Lesser spotted eagle, Aquila pomarina
 Verreaux's eagle, Aquila verreauxii
 Bonelli's eagle, Aquila fasciata
 Martial eagle, Polemaetus bellicosus
 African crowned eagle, Stephanoaetus coronatus
 Booted eagle, Hieraaetus pennatus
 Wahlberg's eagle, Hieraaetus wahlbergi
 Long-crested eagle, Lophaetus occipitalis
 Forest buzzard, Buteo oreophilus trizonatus
 Augur buzzard, Buteo augur
 Long-legged buzzard, Buteo rufinus - accidental
 Steppe buzzard, Buteo buteo vulpinus
 Jackal buzzard, Buteo rufofuscus

Subfamily: Circaetinae
 Brown snake eagle, Ciraetus cinereus
 Black-breasted snake-eagle, Circaetus pectoralis
 Fasciated snake-eagle, Ciraetus fasciolatus
 Western banded snake eagle, Circaetus cinerascens

Subfamily: Perninae
 European honey buzzard, Pernis apivorus
 Lizard buzzard, Kaupifalco monogrammicus
 African cuckoo hawk, Aviceda cuculoides

Subfamily: Circinae
 African marsh harrier, Circus ranivorus
 European marsh harrier,  Circus aeruginosus
 Black harrier, Circus maurus
 Montagu's harrier, Circus pygargus
 Pallid harrier, Circus macrourus
 African harrier-hawk, Polyboroides typus
 Gymnogene, Polyboroides typus

Subfamily: Milvinae
 Black kite, Milvus migrans
 Yellow-billed kite, Milvus aegyptius

Subfamily: Elaninae
 Black-winged kite, Elanus caeruleus
 Bat hawk, Macheiramphus alcinus

Subfamily: Accipitrinae
 Southern pale chanting, Melierax canorus
 Dark chanting goshawk, Melierax metabates
 Gabar goshawk, Melierax gabar
 Ovambo sparrowhawk, Accipiter ovampensis
 Gabar goshawk, Micronisus gabar
 Little sparrowhawk, Accipiter minullus
 Black sparrowhawk, Accipiter melanoleucus
 African goshawk, Accipiter tachiro
 Rufous-chested sparrowhawk, Accipiter rufiventris
 Shikra, Accipiter badius

Secretarybird
Order: AccipitriformesFamily: Sagittariidae

The secretarybird is an extraordinary bird of prey. Endemic to Africa, this mostly terrestrial bird is usually found in the open grasslands and savannahs of sub-Sahara Africa.

 Secretarybird, Sagittarius serpentarius

Falcons, hobbies, and kestrels
Order: FalconiformesFamily: Falconidae

Falconidae is a family of diurnal birds of prey. They differ from hawks, eagles and kites in that they kill with their beaks instead of their talons. There are 62 species worldwide and 16 in Southern Africa.

Falcons
 Pygmy falcon, Polihierax semitorquatus
 Lanner falcon, Falco biarmicus
 Peregrine falcon, Falco peregrinus
 Taita falcon, Falco fasciinucha
 Red-necked falcon, Falco chicquera
 Eleonora's falcon, Falco eleonorae - accidental
 Sooty falcon, Falco concolor
 Amur falcon,  Falco amurensis
 Red-footed falcon, Falco vespertinus

Kestrels
 Lesser kestrel, Falco naumanni
 Rock kestrel, Falco rupicolus
 Greater kestrel, Falco rupicoloides
 Grey kestrel, Falco ardosiaceus
 Dickinson's kestrel, Falco dickinsoni

Hobbies
 European hobby, Falco subbuteo
 African hobby, Falco cuvierii

Quails to peafowl
Order: GalliformesFamily: Phasianidae

The Phasianidae are a family of terrestrial birds that consists of quails, partridges, snowcocks, francolins, spurfowls, tragopans, monals, pheasants, peafowls and jungle fowls. In general, they are plump (though they vary in size) and have broad, relatively short wings. There are 156 species worldwide and 17 in Southern Africa.

Francolins
 Orange River francolin, Scleroptila levaillantoides
 Red-winged francolin, Scleroptila levaillantii
 Grey-winged francolin, Scleroptila africanus - endemic
 Shelley's francolin, Scleroptila shelleyi
 Coqui francolin, Peliperdix coqui
 Crested francolin, Dendroperdix sephaena
 Swainson's francolin, Francolinus swainsonii

Spurfowls
 Hartlaub's spurfowl, Pternistis hartlaubi
 Red-billed spurfowl, Pternistis adspersus
 Cape spurfowl, Pternistis capensis - endemic
 Natal spurfowl, Pternistis natalensis
 Red-necked spurfowl, Pternistis afer

Partridge
 Chukar partridge, Alectoris chukar - introduced

Peafowl
 Indian peafowl, Pavo cristatus - introduced

Quails
 Common quail, Coturnix coturnix
 Harlequin quail, Coturnix delegorguei
 Blue quail, Coturnix adansonii

Ostrich
Order: StruthioniformesFamily: Struthionidae

The ostrich is the only living species of its family, Struthionidae, and its genus, Struthio.

 Common ostrich, Struthio camelus

Guineafowls
Order: GalliformesFamily: Numididae

Guineafowls are a group of African seed-eating, ground-nesting birds resembling partridges, but with featherless heads and spangled grey plumage. There are six species worldwide and two in Southern Africa.

 Crested guineafowl, Guttera edouardi
 Helmeted guineafowl, Numida meleagris

Rails to gallinules
Order: GruiformesFamily: Rallidae

Rallidae is a large family of small to medium-sized birds that includes the rails, crakes, moorhens, coots, flufftails and gallinules. The most typical family members occupy dense vegetation in damp environments near lakes, swamps or rivers. In general they are shy and secretive birds, making them difficult to observe. Most species have strong legs and long toes well adapted to soft uneven surfaces. They tend to have short, rounded wings and to be weak fliers. There are 143 species worldwide and 19 in Southern Africa.

Crakes
 African crake, Crecopsis egregia
 Corn crake, Crex crex
 Black crake, Amaurornis flavirostris
 Baillon's crake, Porzana pusilla
 Spotted crake, Porzana porzana
 Striped crake, Aenigmatolimnas marginalis

Rails
 African rail, Rallus caerulescens

Coots
 Red-knobbed coot, Fulica cristata

Gallinules
 Allen's gallinule, Porphyrio alleni
 American purple gallinule, Porphyrio martinicus - accidental
 African swamphen, Porphyrio madagascariensis

Flufftails
 Buff-spotted flufftail, Sarothrura elegans
 Red-chested flufftail, Sarothrura rufa
 Streaky-breasted flufftail, Sarothrura boehmi - accidental
 Striped flufftail, Sarothrura affinis
 White-winged flufftail, Sarothrura ayresi - accidental
 Chestnut-headed flufftail, Sarothrura lugens

Moorhens
 Common moorhen, Gallinula chloropus
 Lesser moorhen, Gallinula angulata

Finfoots
Order: GruiformesFamily: Heliornithidae

The finfoots are a small family of tropical birds with webbed lobes on their feet similar to those of grebes and coots. There are three species and one occurs in Southern Africa.

 African finfoot, Podica senegalensis

Buttonquails
Order: CharadriiformesFamily: Turnicidae

The buttonquails or hemipodes are a small family of birds that resemble, but are unrelated to, true quails.

 Kurrichane buttonquail, Turnix sylvaticus
 Black-rumped buttonquail, Turnix nanus
 Fynbos buttonquail, Turnix hottentottus

Jacanas
Order: CharadriiformesFamily: Jacanidae

The jacanas are a group of tropical waders in the family Jacanidae. They are found worldwide within the tropical zone. They are identifiable by their huge feet and claws that enable them to walk on floating vegetation in the shallow lakes that are their preferred habitat. There eight species worldwide and two in Southern Africa.

 African jacana, Actophilornis africanus
 Lesser jacana, Microparra capensis

Cranes
Order: GruiformesFamily: Gruidae

Cranes are large, long-legged and long-necked birds of the order Gruiformes, and family Gruidae. There are 15 living species of cranes worldwide and three in Southern Africa.

 Grey crowned crane, Balearica regulorum
 Blue crane, Anthropoides paradiseus
 Wattled crane, Bugeranus carunculatus

Bustards and korhaans

Order: OtidiformesFamily: Otididae

Bustards and korhaans are large terrestrial birds mainly associated with dry open country and steppes in the Old World. They make up the family Otididae (formerly known as Otidae). Bustards and korhaans are omnivorous and nest on the ground. They walk steadily on strong legs and big toes, pecking for food as they go. They have long broad wings with "fingered" wingtips and striking patterns in flight. Many have interesting mating displays. There are 27 species worldwide, 11 in Southern Africa.

 Denham's bustard, Neotis denhami
 Ludwig's bustard, Neotis ludwigii - near-endemic
 Kori bustard, Ardeotis kori (nom. race)
 Black-bellied bustard, Lissotis melanogaster
 Red-crested korhaan, Lophotis ruficrista
 Southern black korhaan, Afrotis afra - endemic
 Northern black korhaan, Afrotis afraoides - endemic
 Rüppell's korhaan, Eupodotis rueppellii - near-endemic
 Karoo korhaan, Eupodotis vigorsii - endemic
 Blue korhaan, Eupodotis caerulescens - endemic
 White-bellied korhaan, Eupodotis senegalensis

Crab-plover
Order: CharadriiformesFamily: Dromadidae

The crab-plover, Dromas ardeola is a bird related to the waders, but is sufficiently distinctive to be a family unto itself Dromadidae. Its relationship within the Charadriiformes is unclear, some writers have them in close to the thick-knees, or the pratincoles, or even closer to the auks and gulls. It is the only member of the genus Dromas.

 Crab-plover, Dromas ardeola

Oystercatchers
Order: CharadriiformesFamily: Haematopodidae

The oystercatchers are large, obvious and noisy plover-like birds, with strong bills used for smashing or prising open molluscs. There are 11 species worldwide and two in Southern Africa.

 Eurasian oystercatcher, Haematopus ostralegus
 African black oystercatcher, Haematopus moquini

Stilts and avocets
Order: CharadriiformesFamily: Recurvirostridae

Recurvirostridae is a family of large wading birds that includes avocets and stilts. Avocets have long legs and long up-curved bills. Stilts have extremely long legs and long, thin, straight bills. There are nine species worldwide, two in Southern Africa.

 Black-winged stilt, Himantopus himantopus
 Pied avocet, Recurvirostra avosetta

Plovers and lapwings
Order: CharadriiformesFamily: Charadriidae

The family Charadriidae includes the plovers, dotterels and lapwings. They are small to medium-sized birds with compact bodies, short, thick necks and long, usually pointed, wings. They are found in open country worldwide, mostly in habitats near water. There are 66 species worldwide, 21 in Southern Africa.

 Pacific golden plover, Pluvialis fulva - accidental
 American golden plover, Pluvialis dominica - accidental
 Grey plover, Pluvialis squatarola
 Common ringed plover, Charadrius hiaticula
 Little ringed plover, Charadrius dubius
 Kittlitz's plover, Charadrius pecuarius
 Three-banded plover, Charadrius tricollaris
 Chestnut-banded plover, Charadrius pallidus
 Kentish plover, Charadrius alexandrinus - accidental
 White-fronted plover, Charadrius marginatus
 Lesser sand plover, Charadrius mongolus
 Greater sand plover, Charadrius leschenaultii
 Caspian plover, Charadrius asiaticus
 Long-toed lapwing, Vanellus crassirostris - accidental
 Blacksmith lapwing, Vanellus armatus
 Spur-winged lapwing, Vanellus spinosus
 White-crowned lapwing, Vanellus albiceps
 African wattled lapwing, Vanellus senegallus
 Senegal lapwing, Vanellus lugubris
 Black-winged lapwing, Vanellus melanopterus
 Crowned lapwing, Vanellus coronatus

Sandpipers to phalaropes
Order: CharadriiformesFamily: Scolopacidae

Scolopacidae is a large diverse family of small to medium-sized shorebirds including the sandpipers, curlews, godwits, shanks, tattlers, woodcocks, snipes, dowitchers and phalaropes. The majority of these species eat small invertebrates picked out of the mud or soil. Different lengths of legs and bills enable multiple species to feed in the same habitat, particularly on the coast, without direct competition for food. There are 86 species worldwide, 37 in Southern Africa.

Shanks and tattlers (Genera: Xenus, Actitis, Tringa and Heteroscelus)
 Marsh sandpiper, Tringa stagnatilis
 Spotted redshank, Tringa erythropus - accidental
 Common redshank, Tringa totanus - accidental
 Common greenshank, Tringa nebularia
 Greater yellowlegs, Tringa melanoleuca - accidental
 Lesser yellowlegs, Tringa flavipes - accidental
 Green sandpiper, Tringa ochropus
 Wood sandpiper, Tringa glareola
 Terek sandpiper, Xenus cinereus
 Common sandpiper, Actitis hypoleucos

Calidrids and turnstones (Genera: Calidris, Aphriza, Eurynorhynchus, Limicola, Tryngites, Arenaria and Philomachus)

 Red knot, Calidris canutus
 Great knot, Calidris tenuirostris - accidental
 Sanderling, Calidris alba
 Baird's sandpiper, Calidris bairdii - accidental
 White-rumped sandpiper, Calidris fuscicollis - accidental
 Pectoral sandpiper, Calidris melanotos - accidental
 Dunlin, Calidris alpina - accidental
 Curlew sandpiper, Calidris ferruginea
 Buff-breasted sandpiper, Tryngites subruficollis - accidental
 Broad-billed sandpiper, Limicola falcinellus - accidental
 Little stint, Calidris minuta
 Red-necked stint, Calidris ruficollis - accidental
 Temminck's stint, Calidris temminckii - accidental
 Long-toed stint, Calidris subminuta - accidental
 Ruddy turnstone, Arenaria interpres
 Ruff, Philomachus pugnax

Snipe and woodcocks (Genera: Coenocorypha, Lymnocryptes, Gallinago and Scolopax)
 Great snipe, Gallinago media - accidental
 African snipe, Gallinago nigripennis

Godwits (Genus: Limosa)
 Black-tailed godwit, Limosa limosa
 Hudsonian godwit, Limosa haemastica - accidental
 Bar-tailed godwit, Limosa lapponica

Curlews (Genus: Numenius)
 Common whimbrel, Numenius phaeopus
 Eurasian curlew, Numenius arquata

Phalaropes (Genus Phalaropus)
 Wilson's phalarope, Steganopus tricolor - accidental
 Red-necked phalarope, Phalaropus lobatus
 Red phalarope, Phalaropus fulicaria

Painted-snipe
Order: CharadriiformesFamily: Rostratulidae

Painted-snipes are three distinctive wader species placed together in their own family Rostratulidae. They are short-legged, long-billed birds similar in shape to the true snipes, but much more brightly coloured. There are three species of painted-snipe worldwide, one in Southern Africa.

 Greater painted-snipe, Rostratula benghalensis

Pratincoles and coursers
Order: CharadriiformesFamily: Glareolidae

Glareolidae is a family of birds in the wader suborder Charadri. There are 17 species worldwide, eight in Southern Africa.

The pratincoles have short legs, long pointed wings and long forked tails. They typically hunt their insect prey on the wing like swallows.

 Collared pratincole, Glareola pratincola
 Black-winged pratincole, Glareola nordmanni
 Rock pratincole, Glareola nuchalis - accidental

The coursers have long legs, short wings and long, pointed bills that curve downwards. They inhabit deserts and similar arid regions.

 Double-banded courser, Rhinoptilus africanus
 Bronze-winged courser, Rhinoptilus chalcopterus
 Three-banded courser, Rhinoptilus cinctus - accidental
 Burchell's courser, Cursorius rufus
 Temminck's courser, Cursorius temminckii

Thick-knees
Order: CharadriiformesFamily: Burhinidae

The stone-curlews or thick-knees are a group of largely tropical waders in the family Burhinidae. They are found worldwide within the tropical zone, with some species also breeding in temperate Europe and Australia.

They are medium to large waders with strong black or yellow-black bills, large yellow eyes—which give them a reptilian appearance—and cryptic plumage. There are nine species worldwide and two of which occur in Southern Africa.

 Water thick-knee, Burhinus vermiculatus
 Spotted thick-knee, Burhinus capensis

Skuas and jaegers
Order: CharadriiformesFamily: Stercorariidae

The family Stercorariidae are, in general, medium to large birds, typically with grey or brown plumage, often with white markings on the wings. They nest on the ground in temperate and arctic regions and are long-distance migrants. There are seven species worldwide and five in Southern Africa.

 Subantarctic skua, Catharacta antarctica
 South polar skua, Catharacta maccormicki - accidental
 Pomarine jaeger, Stercorarius pomarinus
 Parasitic jaeger, Stercorarius parasiticus
 Long-tailed jaeger, Stercorarius longicaudus

Sheathbills
Order: CharadriiformesFamily: Chionididae

The sheathbills are the two species of birds in the genus Chionis in the family Chionididae. They are confined to Antarctic regions, and are the only Antarctic birds without webbed feet. There are two species worldwide, one in Southern Africa.

 Snowy sheathbill, Chionis alba (A)

Gulls and kittiwakes
Order: CharadriiformesFamily: Laridae

Laridae is a family of medium to large seabirds, the gulls and kittiwakes. They are typically grey or white, often with black markings on the head or wings. They have stout, longish bills and webbed feet. There are 55 species worldwide, 13 in Southern Africa.

 Kelp gull, Larus dominicanus
 White-eyed gull, Ichthyaetus leucophthalmus
 Ring-billed gull, Larus delawarensis
 Lesser black-backed gull, Larus fuscus
 Heuglin's gull, Larus heuglini - accidental
 Caspian gull, Larus cachinnans - accidental
 Grey-headed gull, Chroicocephalus cirrocephalus
 Hartlaub's gull, Chroicocephalus hartlaubii
 Common black-headed gull, Chroicocephalus ridibundus - accidental
 Slender-billed gull, Chroicocephalus genei
 Franklin's gull, Leucophaeus pipixcan - accidental
 Sabine's gull, Xema sabini
 Black-legged kittiwake, Rissa tridactyla - accidental

Skimmers
Order: CharadriiformesFamily: Rynchopidae

The skimmers are a small family of tern-like birds in the order Charadriiformes. They have an elongated lower mandible that they use to feed while flying low over the water, skimming the water for small fish. There are three species worldwide, one in Southern Africa.

 African skimmer, Rynchops flavirostris

Terns and noddies
Order: CharadriiformesFamily: Sternidae

Terns and noddies are a group of generally medium to large seabirds typically with grey or white plumage, often with black markings on the head. Most terns hunt fish by diving but some pick insects off the surface of fresh water. Terns are generally long-lived birds, with several species known to live in excess of 30 years. There are 44 species worldwide, 22 in Southern Africa.

 Gull-billed tern, Gelochelidon nilotica - accidental
 Caspian tern, Hydroprogne caspia
 Royal tern, Thalasseus maximus
 Lesser crested tern, Thalasseus bengalensis
 Greater crested tern, Thalasseus bergii
 Sandwich tern, Thalasseus sandvicensis
 Roseate tern, Sterna dougallii
 Black-naped tern, Sterna sumatrana - accidental
 Common tern, Sterna hirundo
 Arctic tern, Sterna paradisaea
 Antarctic tern, Sterna vittata
 White-cheeked tern, Sterna repressa - accidental
 Little tern, Sternula albifrons
 Damara tern, Sternula balaenarum
 Bridled tern, Onychoprion anaethetus - accidental
 Sooty tern, Onychoprion fuscatus
 Whiskered tern, Chlidonias hybrida
 White-winged tern, Chlidonias leucopterus
 Black tern, Chlidonias niger
 White tern, Gygis alba
 Brown noddy, Anous stolidus - accidental
 Lesser noddy, Anous tenuirostris - accidental

Sandgrouses
Order: PterocliformesFamily: Pteroclidae

The sandgrouses are a group of 16 near passerine bird species in the order Pterocliformes. They are restricted to treeless open country in the Old World, such as plains and semi-deserts. Sandgrouse have small, pigeon like heads and necks, but sturdy compact bodies. They have long pointed wings and sometimes tails and a fast direct flight. Flocks fly to watering holes at dawn and dusk. There are 16 species worldwide, four in Southern Africa.

 Namaqua sandgrouse, Pterocles namaqua
 Yellow-throated sandgrouse, Pterocles gutturalis
 Double-banded sandgrouse, Pterocles bicinctus
 Burchell's sandgrouse, Pterocles burchelli

Pigeons and doves
Order: ColumbiformesFamily: Columbidae

Pigeons and doves are stout-bodied birds with short necks and short slender bills with a fleshy cere.

 Rock dove, Columba livia
 Speckled pigeon, Columba guinea
 African olive pigeon, Columba arquatrix
 Eastern bronze-naped pigeon, Columba delegorguei
 Lemon dove, Aplopelia larvata
 Laughing dove, Spilopelia senegalensis
 Cape turtle dove, Streptopelia capicola
 Mourning collared dove, Streptopelia decipiens
 Cape turtle dove, Streptopelia capicola
 Red-eyed dove, Streptopelia semitorquata
 Emerald-spotted wood dove, Turtur chalcospilos
 Blue-spotted wood dove, Turtur afer
 Tambourine dove, Turtur tympanistria
 Namaqua dove, Oena capensis
 African green pigeon, Treron calvus

African and New World parrots
Order: PsittaciformesFamily: Psittacidae.

Poicephalus
 Cape parrot, Poicephalus robustus
 Grey-headed parrot, Poicephalus fuscicollis
 Meyer's parrot, Poicephalus meyeri
 Brown-headed parrot, Poicephalus cryptoxanthus
 Rüppell's parrot, Poicephalus rueppellii

Old World parrots
Order: PsittaciformesFamily: Psittaculidae.

Agapornis
 Peach-faced lovebird, Agapornis roseicollis
 Lilian's lovebird, Agapornis lilianae
 Black-cheeked lovebird, Agapornis nigrigenis

Psittacula
 Rose-ringed parakeet, Psittacula krameri - introduced

Turacos
Order: CuculiformesFamily: Musophagidae

The turacos, plantain eaters and go-away birds make up the bird family Musophagidae (literally banana-eaters). In Southern Africa both turacos and go-away birds are commonly known as louries. Traditionally, this group has been placed in the cuckoo order Cuculiformes, but Sibley-Ahlquist taxonomy raises this group to a full order Musophagiformes. There are 23 species worldwide, six in Southern Africa.

 Schalow's turaco, Tauraco schalowi
 Livingstone's turaco, Tauraco livingstonii
 Knysna turaco, Tauraco corythaix
 Ross's turaco, Musophaga rossae
 Purple-crested turaco, Gallirex porphyreolophus
 Grey go-away-bird, Corythaixoides concolor

Cuckoos
Order: CuculiformesFamily: Cuculidae

The family Cuculidae includes cuckoos, coucals, roadrunners and anis. These birds are of variable size with slender bodies, long tails and strong legs. There are 138 species worldwide, 21 in Southern Africa.

Cuckoo
 Jacobin cuckoo, Clamator jacobinus
 Levaillant's cuckoo, Clamator levaillantii
 Great spotted cuckoo, Clamator glandarius
 Thick-billed cuckoo, Pachycoccyx audeberti
 Red-chested cuckoo, Cuculus solitarius
 Black cuckoo, Cuculus clamosus
 Common cuckoo, Cuculus canorus
 African cuckoo, Cuculus gularis
 Lesser cuckoo, Cuculus poliocephalus - accidental
 Madagascar cuckoo, Cuculus rochii - accidental
 Barred long-tailed cuckoo, Cercococcyx montanus
 Klaas's cuckoo, Chrysococcyx klaas
 African emerald cuckoo, Chrysococcyx cupreus
 Diderick cuckoo, Chrysococcyx caprius
 Green malkoha, Ceuthmochares australis

Coucals
 Black coucal, Centropus grillii
 Coppery-tailed coucal, Centropus cupreicaudus
 Senegal coucal, Centropus senegalensis
 White-browed coucal, Centropus superciliosus
 Burchell's coucal, Centropus burchellii

Barn owls
Order: StrigiformesFamily: Tytonidae

Barn owls are medium to large owls with large heads and characteristic heart-shaped faces. They have long strong legs with powerful talons. There are 16 species worldwide, two in Southern Africa.

 Barn owl, Tyto alba
 African grass owl, Tyto capensis

Typical owls
Order: StrigiformesFamily: Strigidae

The typical owls are small to large solitary nocturnal birds of prey. They have large forward-facing eyes and ears, a hawk-like beak and a conspicuous circle of feathers around each eye called a facial disk. There are 195 species worldwide and ten in Southern Africa.

 African scops owl, Otus senegalensis
 Southern white-faced owl, Ptilopsis granti
 Cape eagle-owl, Bubo capensis
 Spotted eagle-owl, Bubo africanus
 Verreaux's eagle-owl, Bubo lacteus
 Pel's fishing owl, Scotopelia peli
 African wood owl, Strix woodfordii
 Pearl-spotted owlet, Glaucidium perlatum
 African barred owlet, Glaucidium capense
 Marsh owl, Asio capensis

Nightjars
Order: CaprimulgiformesFamily: Caprimulgidae

Nightjars are medium-sized nocturnal birds that usually nest on the ground. They have long wings, short legs and very short bills. Most have small feet, of little use for walking, and long pointed wings. Their soft plumage is cryptically coloured to resemble bark or leaves. There are 86 species worldwide, seven in Southern Africa.

 Fiery-necked nightjar, Caprimulgus pectoralis
 Freckled nightjar, Caprimulgus tristigma
 Swamp nightjar, Caprimulgus natalensis
 Square-tailed nightjar, Caprimulgus fossii
 Rufous-cheeked nightjar, Caprimulgus rufigena
 European nightjar, Caprimulgus europaeus
 Pennant-winged nightjar, Macrodipteryx vexillarius

Swifts and spinetails
Order: ApodiformesFamily: Apodidae

Swifts and spinetails are small birds which spend the majority of their lives flying. These birds have very short legs and never settle voluntarily on the ground, perching instead only on vertical surfaces. Many swifts have long swept-back wings which resemble a crescent or boomerang. There are 98 species worldwide, 13 in Southern Africa.

Swifts
 Scarce swift, Schoutedenapus myoptilus
 African palm swift, Cypsiurus parvus
 Alpine swift, Tachymarptis melba
 Mottled swift, Tachymarptis aequatorialis
 Common swift, Apus apus
 Pallid swift, Apus pallidus
 African black swift, Apus barbatus
 Bradfield's swift, Apus bradfieldi
 Little swift, Apus affinis
 Horus swift, Apus horus
 White-rumped swift, Apus caffer

Spinetails
 Mottled spinetail, Telacanthura ussheri
 Bat-like spinetail, Neafrapus boehmi

Trogons
Order: TrogoniformesFamily: Trogonidae

The trogons and quetzals feed on insects and fruit, and their broad bills and weak legs reflect their diet and arboreal habits. Though fast fliers, they are reluctant to fly any distance. Trogons do not migrate. There are 39 species worldwide, one in Southern Africa.

 Narina trogon, Apaloderma narina

Pittas
Order: PasseriformesFamily: Pittidae

Pittas are medium-sized by passerine standards and are stocky, with strong, longish legs, very short tails and stout bills. Many are brightly coloured. There are 32 species worldwide, one in Southern Africa.

 African pitta, Pitta angolensis

Broadbills
Order: PasseriformesFamily: Eurylaimidae

Broadbills are brightly coloured birds, which feed on fruit and also take insects in flycatcher fashion, snapping their broad bills. Their habitat is canopies of wet forests, so despite their colours, they are difficult to observe. There are 16 species worldwide, one in Southern Africa.

 African broadbill, Smithornis capensis

Mousebirds
Order: ColiiformesFamily: Coliidae

Mousebirds are slender greyish or brown birds with soft, hairlike body feathers and very long thin tails. They are arboreal, and scurry through the leaves like rodents, searching for berries, fruit and buds. There are six species worldwide, three in Southern Africa.

 Red-faced mousebird, Colius indicus
 Speckled mousebird, Colius striatus
 White-backed mousebird, Colius colius

Kingfishers

Kingfishers are medium-sized birds with large heads, long, pointed bills, short legs and stubby tails. There are 94 species worldwide, ten in Southern Africa.

River kingfishers
Order: CoraciiformesSubfamily: Alcedininae

 Half-collared kingfisher, Alcedo semitorquata
 Malachite kingfisher, Alcedo cristata
 African pygmy kingfisher, Ispidina picta

Tree kingfishers
Order: CoraciiformesSubamily: Halcyoninae

 Grey-headed kingfisher, Halcyon leucocephala
 Woodland kingfisher, Halcyon senegalensis
 Mangrove kingfisher, Halcyon senegaloides
 Brown-hooded kingfisher, Halcyon albiventris
 Striped kingfisher, Halcyon chelicuti

Water kingfishers
Order: CoraciiformesSubfamily: Cerylinae

 Giant kingfisher, Megaceryle maximus
 Pied kingfisher, Ceryle rudis

Bee-eaters
Order: CoraciiformesFamily: Meropidae

Bee-eaters are gregarious; they form colonies by nesting in burrows tunnelled into the side of sandy banks, such as those that have collapsed on the edges of rivers. They generally produce two to nine white eggs per clutch—depending on species. They are widely distributed and common. As they live in colonies, large numbers of these holes are often seen together, white streaks from their accumulated droppings accentuating the entrances to the nests. Most of the species in the family are monogamous, and have biparental care of the young. There are 26 species worldwide, nine in Southern Africa.

 White-fronted bee-eater, Merops bullockoides
 Little bee-eater, Merops pusillus
 Swallow-tailed bee-eater, Merops hirundineus
 White-throated bee-eater, Merops albicollis - accidental
 Böhm's bee-eater, Merops boehmi
 Blue-cheeked bee-eater, Merops persicus
 Madagascar bee-eater, Merops superciliosus - accidental
 European bee-eater, Merops apiaster
 Southern carmine bee-eater, Merops nubicoides

Rollers
Order: CoraciiformesFamily: Coraciidae

The rollers are an Old World family of near passerine birds. They resemble crows in size and build, but are more closely related to the kingfishers and bee-eaters. They share the colourful appearance of those groups, blues and browns predominating. The two inner front toes are connected, but not the outer one. There are 11 species worldwide, five in Southern Africa.

 European roller, Coracias garrulus
 Lilac-breasted roller, Coracias caudatus
 Racket-tailed roller, Coracias spatulatus
 Purple roller, Coracias naevius
 Broad-billed roller, Eurystomus glaucurus

Hornbills
Order: CoraciiformesFamily: Bucerotidae

Hornbills are a group of birds that have bills shaped like a cow's horn, but without a twist, sometimes with a casque on the upper mandible. Frequently, the bill is brightly coloured.

 Monteiro's hornbill, Tockus monteiri
 Southern red-billed hornbill, Tockus rufirostris
 Damara red-billed hornbill, Tockus damarensis
 Southern yellow-billed hornbill, Tockus leucomelas
 Crowned hornbill, Tockus alboterminatus
 Bradfield's hornbill, Tockus bradfieldi
 African grey hornbill, Tockus nasutus
 Trumpeter hornbill, Bycanistes bucinator
 Silvery-cheeked hornbill, Bycanistes brevis
 Southern ground-hornbill, Bucorvus leadbeateri

Hoopoe
Order: CoraciiformesFamily: Upupidae

 African hoopoe, Upupa epops africana

Wood hoopoes and scimitarbills
Order: CoraciiformesFamily: Phoeniculidae

Wood hoopoes have metallic plumage, often blue, green or purple, and lack an erectile crest. They are more gregarious than the hoopoe, and can often be seen in small groups. There are seven species worldwide, three in Southern Africa.

 Green wood hoopoe, Phoeniculus purpureus
 Violet wood hoopoe, Phoeniculus damarensis
 Common scimitarbill, Rhinopomastus cyanomelas

Honeyguides
Order: PiciformesFamily: Indicatoridae

Most honeyguides are dull-coloured, though a few have bright yellow in their plumage. All have light outer tail feathers, which are white in all the African species. There are 17 species worldwide, six in Southern Africa.

 Scaly-throated honeyguide, Indicator variegatus
 Greater honeyguide, Indicator indicator
 Lesser honeyguide, Indicator minor
 Pallid honeyguide, Indicator meliphilus
 Green-backed honeybird, Prodotiscus zambesiae
 Brown-backed honeybird, Prodotiscus regulus

Barbets and tinkerbirds
Order: PiciformesFamily: Lybiidae

The barbets and tinkerbirds are plump birds, with short necks and large heads. They get their name from the bristles that fringe their heavy bills. Most species are brightly coloured. Most species of barbet live in tropical forests, though several species of African barbet inhabit woodlands, scrub and even semi-arid environments. There are 84 species worldwide, ten in Southern Africa.

 White-eared barbet, Stactolaema leucotis
 Whyte's barbet, Stactolaema whytii
 Green barbet, Stactolaema olivacea
 Green tinkerbird, Pogoniulus simplex
 Yellow-rumped tinkerbird, Pogoniulus bilineatus
 Yellow-fronted tinkerbird, Pogoniulus chrysoconus
 Red-fronted tinkerbird, Pogoniulus pusillus
 Acacia pied barbet, Tricholaema leucomelas
 Black-collared barbet, Lybius torquatus
 Crested barbet, Trachyphonus vaillantii

Woodpeckers and wrynecks
Order: PiciformesFamily: Picidae

Woodpeckers and wrynecks are small to medium-sized birds with chisel-like beaks, short legs, stiff tails and long tongues used for capturing insects. Some species have feet with two toes pointing forward and two backward, while several species have only three toes. Many woodpeckers have the habit of tapping noisily on tree trunks with their beaks.

 Rufous-necked wryneck, Jynx ruficollis
 Bennett's woodpecker, Campethera bennettii
 Speckle-throated woodpecker, Campethera scriptoricauda
 Golden-tailed woodpecker, Campethera abingoni
 Knysna woodpecker, Campethera notata - endemic
 Green-backed woodpecker, Campethera cailliautii
 Ground woodpecker, Geocolaptes olivaceus - endemic
 Cardinal woodpecker, Dendropicos fuscescens
 Olive woodpecker, Dendropicos griseocephalus
 Bearded woodpecker, Chloropicus namaquus

Larks
Order: PasseriformesFamily: Alaudidae

Larks are small terrestrial birds with often extravagant songs and display flights. Most larks are fairly dull in appearance. They feed on insects and seeds. There are 94 species worldwide, 31 in Southern Africa.

 Monotonous lark, Mirafra passerina - near-endemic
 Melodious lark, Mirafra cheniana - endemic
 Rufous-naped lark, Mirafra africana
 Flappet lark, Mirafra rufocinnamomea
 Cape clapper lark, Mirafra apiata - endemic
 Eastern clapper lark, Mirafra fasciolata - near-endemic
 Rudd's lark, Heteromirafra ruddi - endemic
 Sabota lark, Calendulauda sabota - near-endemic
 Fawn-coloured lark, Calendulauda africanoides - near-endemic
 Red lark, Calendulauda burra - endemic
 Karoo lark, Calendulauda albescens - endemic
 Barlow's lark, Calendulauda barlowi - endemic
 Dune lark, Calendulauda erythrochlamys - endemic
 Dusky lark, Pinarocorys nigricans
 Gray's lark, Ammomanopsis grayi - near-endemic
 Spike-heeled lark, Chersomanes albofasciata - near-endemic
 Cape long-billed lark, Certhilauda curvirostris - endemic
 Agulhas long-billed lark, Certhilauda brevirostris - endemic
 Eastern long-billed lark, Certhilauda semitorquata - endemic
 Karoo long-billed lark, Certhilauda subcoronata - endemic
 Benguela long-billed lark, Certhilauda benguelensis - near-endemic
 Short-clawed lark, Certhilauda chuana - endemic
 Red-capped lark, Calandrella cinerea
 Stark's lark, Spizocorys starki - near-endemic
 Pink-billed lark, Spizocorys conirostris - near-endemic
 Botha's lark, Spizocorys fringillaris - endemic
 Sclater's lark, Spizocorys sclateri - endemic
 Large-billed lark, Galerida magnirostris - endemic
 Black-eared sparrow-lark, Eremopterix australis - endemic
 Chestnut-backed sparrow-lark, Eremopterix leucotis
 Grey-backed sparrow-lark, Eremopterix verticalis - near-endemic

Swallows and martins
Order: PasseriformesFamily: Hirundinidae

The family Hirundinidae is adapted to aerial feeding. They have a slender streamlined body, long pointed wings and a short bill with a wide gape. The feet are adapted to perching rather than walking, and the front toes are partially joined at the base. There are 75 species worldwide, 22 in Southern Africa.

 Sand martin, Riparia riparia
 Brown-throated martin, Riparia paludicola
 Banded martin, Riparia cincta
 Mascarene martin, Phedina borbonica
 Grey-rumped swallow, Pseudhirundo griseopyga
 Barn swallow, Hirundo rustica
 Angola swallow, Hirundo angolensis
 White-throated swallow, Hirundo albigularis
 Wire-tailed swallow, Hirundo smithii
 Blue swallow, Hirundo atrocaerulea
 Pearl-breasted swallow, Hirundo dimidiata
 Greater striped swallow, Hirundo cucullata
 Lesser striped swallow, Hirundo abyssinica
 Rufous-chested swallow, Hirundo semirufa
 Mosque swallow, Hirundo senegalensis
 Red-rumped swallow, Hirundo daurica
 South African cliff swallow, Hirundo spilodera
 Rock martin, Hirundo fuligula
 Common house martin, Delichon urbicum
 White-headed saw-wing, Psalidoprocne albiceps
 Black saw-wing, Psalidoprocne holomelaena
 Eastern saw-wing, Psalidoprocne orientalis

Drongos and flycatchers
Order: PasseriformesFamily: Dicruridae

The family Dicruridae is a relatively recent grouping of a number of seemingly very different birds, mostly from the Southern Hemisphere, which are more closely related than they at first appear. There are 139 species worldwide, six in Southern Africa.

Subfamily: Dicrurinae
 Square-tailed drongo, Dicrurus ludwigii
 Fork-tailed drongo, Dicrurus adsimilis

Subfamily: Monarchinae
 African crested flycatcher, Trochocercus cyanomelas
 African paradise flycatcher, Terpsiphone viridis
 Livingstone's flycatcher, Erythrocercus livingstonei
 White-tailed crested flycatcher, Elminia albonotata

Old World flycatchers
Order: PasseriformesFamily: Muscicapidae

Old World flycatchers are a large group of small passerine birds native to the Old World. They are mainly small arboreal insectivores. The appearance of these birds is highly varied, but they mostly have weak songs and harsh calls.

 Cape rock thrush, Monticola rupestris - endemic
 Sentinel rock thrush, Monticola explorator
 Short-toed rock thrush, Monticola brevipes
 Miombo rock thrush, Monticola angolensis
 Pale flycatcher, Bradornis pallidus
 Chat flycatcher, Bradornis infuscatus
 Mariqua flycatcher, Bradornis mariquensis
 Southern black flycatcher, Melaenornis pammelaina
 Fiscal flycatcher, Sigelus silens
 Spotted flycatcher, Muscicapa striata
 African dusky flycatcher, Muscicapa adusta
 Ashy flycatcher, Muscicapa caerulescens
 Grey tit-flycatcher, Myioparus plumbeus
 Collared flycatcher, Ficedula albicollis
 White-starred robin, Pogonocichla stellata
 Swynnerton's robin, Swynnertonia swynnertoni
 East coast akalat, Sheppardia gunningi
 Thrush nightingale, Luscinia luscinia - accidental
 Cape robin-chat, Cossypha caffra
 White-throated robin-chat, Cossypha humeralis
 White-browed robin-chat, Cossypha heuglini
 Red-capped robin-chat, Cossypha natalensis
 Chorister robin-chat, Cossypha dichroa
 Collared palm thrush, Cichladusa arquata
 Rufous-tailed palm thrush, Cichladusa ruficauda
 Bearded scrub robin, Cercotrichas quadrivirgata
 Brown scrub robin, Cercotrichas signata
 Red-backed scrub robin, Cercotrichas leucophrys
 Kalahari scrub robin, Cercotrichas paena
 Karoo scrub robin, Cercotrichas coryphoeus
 Herero chat, Namibornis herero
 Common redstart, Phoenicurus phoenicurus - accidental
 Whinchat, Saxicola rubetra
 African stonechat, Saxicola torquatus
 Buff-streaked chat, Campicoloides bifasciatus
 Mountain wheatear, Oenanthe monticola
 Northern wheatear, Oenanthe oenanthe - accidental
 Pied wheatear, Oenanthe pleschanka - accidental
 Capped wheatear, Oenanthe pileata
 Isabelline wheatear, Oenanthe isabellina
 Sickle-winged chat, Cercomela sinuata
 Karoo chat, Cercomela schlegelii
 Tractrac chat, Cercomela tractrac
 Familiar chat, Cercomela familiaris
 Southern anteater chat, Myrmecocichla formicivora
 White-headed black-chat, Myrmecocichla arnotti
 Mocking cliff chat, Thamnolaea cinnamomeiventris
 Boulder chat, Pinarornis plumosus

Cuckooshrikes
Order: PasseriformesFamily: Campephagidae

Cuckooshrikes are medium to small arboreal birds, generally long and slender. They are predominantly greyish with white and black. There are 84 species worldwide, three in Southern Africa.

 White-breasted cuckooshrike, Coracina pectoralis
 Grey cuckooshrike, Coracina caesia
 Black cuckooshrike, Campephaga flava

Orioles
Order: PasseriformesFamily: Oriolidae

Orioles are colourful Old World passerine birds in the family Oriolidae. They are not related to the New World orioles, which are icterids, family Icteridae. There are 25 species worldwide, four in Southern Africa.

 Eurasian golden oriole, Oriolus oriolus
 African golden oriole, Oriolus auratus
 Green-headed oriole, Oriolus chlorocephalus
 Black-headed oriole, Oriolus larvatus

Ravens and crows
Order: PasseriformesFamily: Corvidae

Ravens and crows are medium to large birds with strong feet and bills, rictal bristles and a single moult each year (most passerines moult twice). There are 120 species worldwide, four in Southern Africa.
 House crow, Corvus splendens - introduced
 Cape crow, Corvus capensis
 Pied crow, Corvus albus
 White-necked raven, Corvus albicollis

Tits
Order: PasseriformesFamily: Paridae

The tits, chickadees and titmice, family Paridae, are a large family of small passerine birds, mainly small stocky woodland species with short stout bills. Some have crests. They are adaptable birds, with a mixed diet including seeds and insects. Many species live around human habitation and come readily to bird feeders for nuts or seeds, and can learn to take other foods. There are 59 species worldwide, five in Southern Africa.

 Southern black tit, Parus niger
 Rufous-bellied tit, Parus rufiventris
 Miombo tit, Parus griseiventris
 Ashy tit, Parus cinerascens
 Grey tit, Parus afer

Penduline tits
Order: PasseriformesFamily: Remizidae

There are 15 species worldwide, two in Southern Africa.

 Cape penduline tit, Anthoscopus minutus
 African penduline tit, Anthoscopus caroli

Spotted creeper
Order: PasseriformesFamily: Certhiidae

Subfamily: Salpornithinae

 Spotted creeper, Salpornis salvadori

Laughingthrushes
Order: PasseriformesFamily: Leiothrichidae

 Black-faced babbler, Turdoides melanops
 Hartlaub's babbler, Turdoides hartlaubii
 Southern pied babbler, Turdoides bicolor
 Arrow-marked babbler, Turdoides jardineii
 Bare-cheeked babbler, Turdoides gymnogenys

Bulbuls and nicators
Order: PasseriformesFamily: Pycnonotidae

Bulbuls and nicators are mostly frugivorous birds. Some are colourful with yellow, red or orange vents, cheeks, throats or supercilia, but most are drab, with uniform olive-brown to black plumage. Some have very distinct crests. Many of these species inhabit tree tops, while some are restricted to the undergrowth. Up to five purple-pink eggs are laid in an open tree nests and incubated by the female. There are 130 species worldwide, ten in Southern Africa.

 Dark-capped bulbul, Pycnonotus tricolor
 African red-eyed bulbul, Pycnonotus nigricans
 Cape bulbul, Pycnonotus capensis - endemic
 Sombre greenbul, Andropadus importunus
 Stripe-cheeked greenbul, Andropadus milanjensis
 Yellow-bellied greenbul, Chlorocichla flaviventris
 Terrestrial brownbul, Phyllastrephus terrestris
 Yellow-streaked greenbul, Phyllastrephus flavostriatus
 Lowland tiny greenbul, Phyllastrephus debilis
 Eastern nicator, Nicator gularis

Thrushes
Order: PasseriformesFamily: Turdidae

The thrushes are a group of passerine birds that occur mainly but not exclusively in the Old World. They are plump, soft plumaged, small to medium-sized insectivores or sometimes omnivores, often feeding on the ground. Many have attractive songs.

 Orange ground thrush, Geokichla gurneyi
 Spotted ground thrush, Geokichla guttata
 Groundscraper thrush, Psophocichla litsitsirupa
 Kurrichane thrush, Turdus libonyanus
 Olive thrush, Turdus olivaceus
 Karoo thrush, Turdus smithi
 White-chested alethe, Pseudalethe fuelleborni

African warblers
Order: PasseriformesFamily: Macrosphenidae
 Moustached grass warbler, Melocichla mentalis
 Victorin's warbler, Cryptillas victorini - endemic
 Red-capped crombec, Sylvietta ruficapilla
 Red-faced crombec, Sylvietta whytii
 Long-billed crombec, Sylvietta rufescens
 Rockrunner, Achaetops pycnopygius
 Cape grassbird, Sphenoeacus afer
 Cape rockjumper, Chaetops frenatus - endemic
 Drakensberg rockjumper, Chaetops aurantius - endemic

Locustellid warblers
Order: PasseriformesFamily: Locustellidae
 Broad-tailed warbler, Schoenicola brevirostris
 River warbler, Locustella fluviatilis
 Little rush warbler, Bradypterus baboecala
 Knysna warbler, Bradypterus sylvaticus - endemic
 Barratt's warbler, Bradypterus barratti

Old World warblers
Order: PasseriformesFamily: Sylviidae

The Old World warblers are of generally undistinguished appearance, but many have distinctive songs.

 Garden warbler, Sylvia borin
 Common whitethroat, Sylvia communis
 Eurasian blackcap, Sylvia atricapilla - accidental
 Layard's warbler, Sylvia layardi
 Chestnut-vented warbler, Sylvia subcaerulea
 Bush blackcap, Lioptilus nigricapillus

Acrocephalid warblers
Order: PasseriformesFamily: Acrocephalidae

 Sedge warbler, Acrocephalus schoenobaenus
 Eurasian reed warbler, Acrocephalus scirpaceus
 African reed warbler, Acrocephalus baeticatus
 Marsh warbler, Acrocephalus palustris
 Great reed warbler, Acrocephalus arundinaceus
 Basra reed warbler, Acrocephalus griseldis - accidental
 Greater swamp warbler, Acrocephalus rufescens
 Lesser swamp warbler, Acrocephalus gracilirostris
 Olive-tree warbler, Hippolais olivetorum
 Icterine warbler, Hippolais icterina
 African yellow warbler, Iduna natalensis

Phylloscopid warblers
Order: PasseriformesFamily: Phylloscopidae
 Yellow-throated woodland warbler, Phylloscopus ruficapilla
 Willow warbler, Phylloscopus trochilus

Hyliotid warblers
 Yellow-bellied hyliota, Hyliota flavigaster
 Southern hyliota, Hyliota australis

Fairy flycatchers
Order: PasseriformesFamily: Stenostiridae
 Fairy flycatcher, Stenostira scita

Apalises, cisticolas and prinias
Order: PasseriformesFamily: Cisticolidae

Cisticolidae are generally very small birds of drab brown or grey appearance found in open country such as grassland or scrub. They are often difficult to see and many species are similar in appearance, so the song is often the best identification guide. These are insectivorous birds that nest low in vegetation. There are 110 species worldwide, 37 in Southern Africa.

Apalis
 Bar-throated apalis, Apalis thoracica
 Yellow-breasted apalis, Apalis flavida
 Rudd's apalis, Apalis ruddi
 Black-headed apalis, Apalis melanocephala
 Chirinda apalis, Apalis chirindensis

Cisticola
 Red-faced cisticola, Cisticola erythrops
 Singing cisticola, Cisticola cantans
 Lazy cisticola, Cisticola aberrans
 Rattling cisticola, Cisticola chiniana
 Tinkling cisticola, Cisticola rufilatus
 Grey-backed cisticola, Cisticola subruficapilla
 Wailing cisticola, Cisticola lais
 Winding cisticola, Cisticola galactotes
 Luapula cisticola, Cisticola luapula
 Chirping cisticola, Cisticola pipiens
 Levaillant's cisticola, Cisticola tinniens
 Croaking cisticola, Cisticola natalensis
 Neddicky, Cisticola fulvicapilla
 Siffling cisticola, Cisticola brachypterus
 Zitting cisticola, Cisticola juncidis
 Desert cisticola, Cisticola aridulus
 Cloud cisticola, Cisticola textrix
 Pale-crowned cisticola, Cisticola cinnamomeus
 Wing-snapping cisticola, Cisticola ayresii

Prinia
 Tawny-flanked prinia, Prinia subflava
 Black-chested prinia, Prinia flavicans
 Karoo prinia, Prinia maculosa
 Drakensberg prinia, Prinia hypoxantha
 Red-winged prinia, Prinia erythroptera

Camaroptera
 Green-backed camaroptera, Camaroptera brachyura
 Grey-backed camaroptera, Camaroptera brevicaudata

Eremomela
 Yellow-bellied eremomela, Eremomela icteropygialis
 Greencap eremomela, Eremomela scotops
 Karoo eremomela, Eremomela gregalis
 Burnt-necked eremomela, Eremomela usticollis

Warbler
 Barred wren-warbler, Calamonastes fasciolatus
 Stierling's wren-warbler, Calamonastes stierlingi
 Cinnamon-breasted warbler, Euryptila subcinnamomea
 Namaqua warbler, Phragmacia substriata
 Briar warbler, Oreophilais robertsi
 Rufous-eared warbler, Malcorus pectoralis

White-eyes
Order: PasseriformesFamily: Zosteropidae

White-eyes are mostly of undistinguished appearance, the plumage above being generally either mouse-coloured or greenish-olive, but some species have a white or bright yellow throat, breast or lower parts, and several have buff flanks. They have rounded wings and strong legs. There are 97 species worldwide, three in Southern Africa.

 African yellow white-eye, Zosterops senegalensis
 Cape white-eye, Zosterops virens
 Orange River white-eye, Zosterops pallidus

Wattle-eyes

Order: PasseriformesFamily: Platysteiridae

Wattle-eyes get their name from the brightly coloured fleshy eye decorations found in most species in this group. These insect-eating birds are found in usually open forests or bush. They hunt by flycatching, or by taking prey from the ground like a shrike. There are 30 species worldwide, eight in Southern Africa.

 Black-and-white flycatcher, Bias musicus
 White-tailed shrike, Lanioturdus torquatus
 Cape batis, Batis capensis
 Woodward's batis, Batis fratrum
 Chinspot batis, Batis molitor
 Pale batis, Batis soror
 Pririt batis, Batis pririt
 Black-throated wattle-eye, Platysteira peltata

Wagtails, longclaws and pipits
Order: PasseriformesFamily: Motacillidae

Motacillidae is a family of small passerine birds with medium to long tails. They include the wagtails, longclaws and pipits. They are slender, ground feeding insectivores of open country. They are ground nesters, laying up to six speckled eggs. There are 60 species worldwide, 25 in Southern Africa.

Wagtails
 African pied wagtail, Motacilla aguimp
 Cape wagtail, Motacilla capensis
 Yellow wagtail, Motacilla flava
 Citrine wagtail, Motacilla citreola
 Grey wagtail, Motacilla cinerea - accidental
 Mountain wagtail, Motacilla clara

Pipits
 Golden pipit, Tmetothylacus tenellus - accidental
 Yellow-breasted pipit, Anthus chloris - endemic
 Striped pipit, Anthus lineiventris
 African rock pipit, Anthus crenatus
 African pipit, Anthus cinnamomeus
 Mountain pipit, Anthus hoeschi
 Plain-backed pipit, Anthus leucophrys
 Buffy pipit, Anthus vaalensis
 Long-tailed pipit, Anthus longicaudatus - endemic
 Long-billed pipit, Anthus similis
 Kimberley pipit, Anthus pseudosimilis
 Wood pipit, Anthus nyassae
 Short-tailed pipit, Anthus brachyurus
 Bush pipit, Anthus caffer
 Tree pipit, Anthus trivialis
 Red-throated pipit, Anthus cervinus - accidental

Longclaws
 Yellow-throated longclaw, Macronyx croceus
 Cape longclaw, Macronyx capensis
 Rosy-throated longclaw, Macronyx ameliae

Shrikes
Order: PasseriformesFamily: Laniidae

A shrike is a passerine bird of the family Laniidae known for catching insects, small birds or mammals, and impaling their bodies on thorns. This helps them tear the flesh into small convenient fragments, and serves as a "larder" so that the shrike can return to feed later. A typical shrike's beak is hooked, like a bird of prey, reflecting its predatory nature. There are 32 species worldwide, six in Southern Africa.

 Red-backed shrike, Lanius collurio
 Souza's shrike, Lanius souzae
 Lesser grey shrike, Lanius minor
 Southern fiscal, Lanius collaris
 Magpie shrike, Corvinella melanoleuca
 Southern white-crowned shrike, Eurocephalus anguitimens

Helmet-shrikes
Order: PasseriformesFamily: Prionopidae

The helmetshrikes are smallish passerine bird species. They were formerly classified with the true shrikes in the family Laniidae, but are now considered sufficiently distinctive to separate from that group as the family Prionopidae. There are 11 species worldwide, three in Southern Africa.

 White helmetshrike, Prionops plumatus
 Retz's helmetshrike, Prionops retzii
 Chestnut-fronted helmetshrike, Prionops scopifrons

Bush-shrikes and tchagras
Order: PasseriformesFamily: Malaconotidae

The bush-shrikes, boubous and tchagras are smallish passerine bird species. They were formerly classed with the true shrikes in the family Laniidae, but are now considered sufficiently distinctive to separate from that group as the family Malaconotidae. There are 43 species worldwide, 16 in Southern Africa.

 Bokmakierie, Telophorus zeylonus
 Sulphur-breasted bushshrike, Telophorus sulfureopectus
 Olive bushshrike, Telophorus olivaceus
 Black-fronted bushshrike, Telophorus nigrifrons
 Gorgeous bushshrike, Telophorus viridis
 Grey-headed bushshrike, Malaconotus blanchoti
 Crimson-breasted shrike, Laniarius atrococcineus
 Tropical boubou, Laniarius aethiopicus
 Swamp boubou, Laniarius bicolor
 Southern boubou, Laniarius ferrugineus
 Anchieta's tchagra, Antichromus anchietae
 Black-crowned tchagra, Tchagra senegalus
 Brown-crowned tchagra, Tchagra australis
 Southern tchagra, Tchagra tchagra
 Brubru, Nilaus afer
 Black-backed puffback, Dryoscopus cubla

Starlings and oxpeckers
Order: Passeriformes. Family: Sturnidae (including Buphaginae, sometimes deemed a distinct family)

Starlings and oxpeckers are small to medium-sized passerines with strong feet and pointed bills. Their flight is strong and direct and they are very gregarious. Their preferred habitat ranges from dry open to moist wooded country, and they may feed on insects, fruit or ticks. Plumage is typically dark with a metallic sheen.

 Pale-winged starling, Onychognathus nabouroup
 Golden-breasted starling, Lamprotornis regius
 Red-winged starling, Onychognathus morio
 Black-bellied starling, Notopholia corrusca
 Cape glossy starling, Lamprotornis nitens
 Greater blue-eared starling, Lamprotornis chalybaeus
 Southern blue-eared glossy-starling, Lamprotornis elisabeth
 Sharp-tailed glossy-starling, Lamprotornis acuticaudus
 Burchell's starling, Lamprotornis australis
 Meves's starling, Lamprotornis mevesii
 Pied starling, Lamprotornis bicolor
 Violet-backed starling, Cinnyricinclus leucogaster
 Wattled starling, Creatophora cinerea
 Common starling, Sturnus vulgaris - introduced
 Common myna, Acridotheres tristis - introduced
 Yellow-billed oxpecker, Buphagus africanus
 Red-billed oxpecker, Buphagus erythrorhynchus

Sugarbirds
Order: PasseriformesFamily: Promeropidae

The two species of sugarbird make up one of only two bird families restricted entirely to Southern Africa, the other being the rock-jumpers Chaetopidae. They are specialist nectar feeders, but also eat insects. They have dull streaky plumage and long tails. The songs are a jumble of metallic-sounding notes.

 Gurney's sugarbird, Promerops gurneyi - endemic
 Cape sugarbird, Promerops cafer - endemic

Sunbirds
Order: PasseriformesFamily: Nectariniidae (which includes spiderhunters in Asia)

The sunbirds are very small passerine birds that feed largely on nectar, though they also take insects, especially when feeding young. Flight is fast and direct on their short wings. Most species can feed while hovering like a hummingbird, but they mostly perch. Strong sexual dimorphism is typical, with males brilliant and females drab. Approximately 131 species exist worldwide, 22 in Southern Africa.

 Plain-backed sunbird, Anthreptes reichenowi - accidental
 Western violet-backed sunbird, Anthreptes longuemarei
 Orange-breasted sunbird, Anthobaphes violacea - endemic
 Olive sunbird, Cyanomitra olivacea
 Mouse-coloured sunbird, Cyanomitra veroxii
 Amethyst sunbird, Chalcomitra amethystina
 Scarlet-chested sunbird, Chalcomitra senegalensis
 Bronzy sunbird, Nectarinia kilimensis
 Malachite sunbird, Nectarinia famosa
 Collared sunbird, Hedydipna collaris
 Miombo double-collared sunbird, Cinnyris manoensis
 Southern double-collared sunbird, Cinnyris chalybeus
 Greater double-collared sunbird, Cinnyris afer
 Neergaard's sunbird, Cinnyris neergaardi
 Variable sunbird, Cinnyris venustus
 White-breasted sunbird, Cinnyris talatala
 Copper sunbird, Cinnyris cupreus
 Dusky sunbird, Cinnyris fuscus
 Shelley's sunbird, Cinnyris shelleyi
 Mariqua sunbird, Cinnyris mariquensis
 Purple-banded sunbird, Cinnyris bifasciatus

Sparrows

Order: PasseriformesFamily: Passeridae

Sparrows are small passerine birds. In general, sparrows tend to be small plump brownish or greyish birds with short tails and short powerful beaks. They are monogamous and build conspicuous nests. Sparrows are granivorous, but also consume small insects. There are 35 species worldwide, six in Southern Africa.

 House sparrow, Passer domesticus - introduced
 Great sparrow, Passer motitensis - near-endemic
 Cape sparrow, Passer melanurus - near-endemic
 Southern grey-headed sparrow, Passer diffusus
 Northern grey-headed sparrow, Passer griseus
 Yellow-throated petronia, Petronia superciliaris

Weavers to widowbirds
Order: PasseriformesFamily: Ploceidae

Weavers, queleas, bishops and widowbirds are small, gregarious passerine birds related to finches. Most inhabit sub-Saharan Africa, though a few species occur in tropical Asia. Their rounded conical bills suit their granivorous diet. Males typically acquire striking summer plumages. Queleas, bishops and weavers are colonial nesters, and the latter group weaves conspicuous suspended nests. Widowbirds to the contrary are solitary, terrestrial nesters, but flock in winter. Of the 114 species worldwide, 27 exist in Southern Africa.

 Red-billed buffalo weaver, Bubalornis niger
 White-browed sparrow-weaver, Plocepasser mahali
 Sociable weaver, Philetairus socius
 Lesser masked weaver, Ploceus intermedius
 Spectacled weaver, Ploceus ocularis
 Cape weaver, Ploceus capensis - endemic
 Yellow weaver, Ploceus subaureus
 Holub's golden weaver, Ploceus xanthops
 Southern brown-throated weaver, Ploceus xanthopterus
 Southern masked weaver, Ploceus velatus
 Village weaver, Ploceus cucullatus
 Chestnut weaver, Ploceus rubiginosus
 Dark-backed weaver, Ploceus bicolor
 Olive-headed weaver, Ploceus olivaceiceps
 Red-headed weaver, Anaplectes melanotis
 Thick-billed weaver, Amblyospiza albifrons
 Red-headed quelea, Quelea erythrops
 Red-billed quelea, Quelea quelea
 Yellow-crowned bishop, Euplectes afer
 Black-winged red bishop, Euplectes hordeaceus
 Southern red bishop, Euplectes orix
 Yellow bishop, Euplectes capensis
 Fan-tailed widowbird, Euplectes axillaris
 Yellow-mantled widowbird, Euplectes macrourus
 White-winged widowbird, Euplectes albonotatus
 Red-collared widowbird, Euplectes ardens
 Long-tailed widowbird, Euplectes progne

Whydahs and indigobirds

The indigobirds and whydahs, are small passerine birds native to Africa. These are finch-like species which usually have black or indigo predominating in their plumage. The whydahs have long or very long tails. All of the species are brood parasites, which lay their eggs in the nests of estrildid finches; most indigobirds use fire-finches as hosts, whereas the paradise whydahs chose pytilias. There are 19 species worldwide, eight in Southern Africa.

 Pin-tailed whydah, Vidua macroura
 Broad-tailed paradise whydah, Vidua obtusa
 Long-tailed paradise whydah, Vidua paradisaea
 Shaft-tailed whydah, Vidua regia
 Village indigobird, Vidua chalybeata
 Dusky indigobird, Vidua funerea
 Purple indigobird, Vidua purpurascens
 Twinspot indigobird, Vidua codringtoni

Estrildid finches
Order: PasseriformesFamily: Estrildidae

The estrildid finches are small passerine birds of the Old World tropics and Australasia. They are gregarious and often colonial seed eaters with short thick but pointed bills. They are all similar in structure and habits, but have wide variation in plumage colours and patterns.

 Green-winged pytilia, Pytilia melba
 Orange-winged pytilia, Pytilia afra - accidental
 Red-billed firefinch, Lagonosticta senegala
 African firefinch, Lagonosticta rubricata
 Jameson's firefinch, Lagonosticta rhodopareia
 Blue-breasted cordon-bleu, Uraeginthus angolensis
 Violet-eared waxbill, Uraeginthus granatina
 Black-faced waxbill, Estrilda erythronotos
 Grey waxbill, Estrilda perreini
 Cinderella waxbill, Estrilda thomensis
 Common waxbill, Estrilda astrild
 Violet-eared waxbill, Granatina granatina
 Blue waxbill, Uraeginthus angolensis
 Yellow-bellied waxbill, Coccopygia quartinia
 Swee waxbill, Coccopygia melanotis
 Zebra waxbill, Sporaeginthus subflavus
 Bronze mannikin, Spermestes cucullatus
 Black-and-white mannikin, Spermestes bicolor
 Magpie mannikin, Spermestes fringilloides
 African quailfinch, Ortygospiza atricollis
 Red-headed finch, Amadina erythrocephala
 Cut-throat finch, Amadina fasciata
 Locust finch, Paludipasser locustella
 Red-throated twinspot, Hypargos niveoguttatus
 Pink-throated twinspot, Hypargos margaritatus
 Green-backed twinspot, Mandingoa nitidula
 Red-faced crimsonwing, Cryptospiza reichenovii
 Lesser seedcracker, Pyrenestes minor

Fringilline finches and allies
Order: PasseriformesFamily: Fringillidae

Finches are seed-eating passerine birds, that are small to moderately large and have a strong beak, usually conical and in some species very large. All have twelve tail feathers and nine primaries. These birds have a bouncing flight with alternating bouts of flapping and gliding on closed wings, and most sing well. There are 137 species worldwide, 15 in Southern Africa.

 Common chaffinch, Fringilla coelebs - introduced
 Cape canary, Serinus canicollis
 Black-headed canary, Serinus alario
 Yellow-fronted canary, Crithagra mozambicus
 Black-throated canary, Crithagra atrogularis
 Lemon-breasted canary, Crithagra citrinipectus
 Forest canary, Crithagra scotops - endemic
 Yellow canary, Crithagra flaviventris
 Brimstone canary, Crithagra sulphuratus
 White-throated canary, Crithagra albogularis
 Protea seedeater, Crithagra leucopterus - endemic
 Streaky-headed seedeater, Crithagra gularis
 Black-eared seedeater, Crithagra mennelli
 Cape siskin, Crithagra totta - endemic
 Drakensberg siskin, Crithagra symonsi - endemic

Buntings
Order: PasseriformesFamily: Emberizidae

Emberizidae is a large family of passerine birds. They are seed eaters with distinctively shaped bills. Those occurring in the Old World are mostly known as buntings. In North America, most of this species are called sparrows, though the latter are not all that closely related to Old World sparrows, which belong to the family Passeridae. Emberizid species typically show distinctive head patterns. Of 275 species worldwide, five occur in Southern Africa.

 Lark-like bunting, Emberiza impetuani
 Cinnamon-breasted bunting, Emberiza tahapisi
 Cape bunting, Emberiza capensis
 Golden-breasted bunting, Emberiza flaviventris
 Cabanis's bunting, Emberiza cabanisi

See also
 Endemic birds of southern Africa
 Lists of birds by region
 List of Gauteng birds
 List of African birds
 List of birds

Notes

References
 Illustrated guide to the Birds of Southern Africa by Ian Sinclair, Phil Hockey and Warwick Tarboton 
 Southern African Birds: A Photographic Guide by Ian Sinclair and Ian Davidson 
 Newman's Birds of Southern Africa: The Green Edition by Kenneth Newman 
 Roberts VII Species List: A 'new' southern African bird list - Percy FitzPatrick Institute of African Ornithology